Aira is a genus of Old World plants in the grass family, native to western and southern Europe, central and southwest Asia, plus Africa.

The common name, shared with the similar related genera Deschampsia and Koeleria, is hair-grass, from the very slender leaves and stems. The species typically occur on dry, sandy sites, and grow to 20–40 cm tall.

Several species are grown as ornamental plants for their very delicate airy seed heads, used in dried flower arrangements.

 Species

 formerly included
Many species now considered better suited to other genera: Agrostis, Antinoria, Arundinella, Arundo, Catabrosa, Colpodium, Corynephorus, Cyrtococcum, Deschampsia, Ehrharta, Eragrostis, Eremopoa, Eriachne, Eustachys, Hierochloe, Koeleria, Molinia, Pentameris, Peyritschia, Poa, Puccinellia, Rostraria, Scolochloa, Sesleria, Sphenopholis, Sporobolus, Tricholaena, Trisetum etc.

See also
 List of Poaceae genera

References

Pooideae
Poaceae genera